Jesús David Briceño Mendoza (born 26 June 1998) is a Venezuelan footballer who plays as a goalkeeper for Deportivo La Guaira.

Career

Club career
In the 2016, Briceño sat on the bench nine times for the clubs first team. 18-year old Briceño got his official debut on 25 February 2017 against Deportivo La Guaira in the Venezuelan Primera División. He made a total of 24 league appearances in the league. At the end of the year, Briceño signed a new deal until the end of 2019. In the 2018 season, however, he made no official appearances for the first team, while he only made one appearance in the following 2019 season. He left Atlético Venezuela at the end of 2021, having made a total of 37 league appearances for the club.

Ahead of the 2022 season, Briceño joined fellow league club Deportivo La Guaira.

References

External links
 

Living people
1998 births
Association football goalkeepers
Venezuelan footballers
Venezuelan Primera División players
Atlético Venezuela C.F. players
Deportivo La Guaira players
Footballers from Caracas